Adlan Cruz (born November 28, 1968) is a  Puerto Rican pianist, composer and producer.

Cruz began playing the piano by ear at the age of three. He released his first album in 1989.

A graduate of the Hartt School in Connecticut, his studies were financed with a scholarship given to him by former Puerto Rico Governor, philanthropist and pianist Luis A. Ferré, whom he impressed early on with his talent.

He sponsors a private foundation to benefit the youth of Brazil.

As part of his worldwide concert schedule over the years, in December, 2000, Cruz performed live before 3.4 million people in Lagos, Nigeria.

In early 2009 he recorded his ninth CD in San Juan, Puerto Rico.

Discography
1989  Instrument of Praise
1993  The Way for the Giver
1995  Adlan: Solus
2001  The Piano According to Adlan
2002  Latin Africa 
2002  Duo Clásico
2003  Colors of Many Nations
2003  Interludes
2003  Return
2004  Shemoneh Esrei - Amidah
2005  The Pianoforte Collection Vol. I & II 
2005  The PianoForte Tour: Live In Brazil DVD & CD
2006  Concierto del Centenario DVD & CD
2007  Piano Latino
2007  Christmas Around the World
2008  Monster Under my Bed: Short Film  Music Score 
2008  Friends in Worship 
2009  Crooked : Short Film Music Score
2009  Inspiration: A Collection of Hymns 
2010  All by Grace: Live in Virginia
2011  Friends in Worship Vol. II 
2011  Live in Bolivia DVD & CD

References

External links
 Adlan Cruz - Official website

1968 births
American performers of Christian music
Living people
People from Bayamón, Puerto Rico
University of Hartford Hartt School alumni